Keleş, is a Turkish surname. Notable people with the surname include:

 Eren Keles (born 1994), Austrian-Turkish footballer
 Ergin Keleş (born 1987), Turkish footballer
 Ersan Keleş (born 1987), Turkish futsal player
 Fatih Keleş (born 1989), Turkish amateur boxer
 İsmail Keleş (born 1988), Turkish sport shooter
 Kadir Keleş (born 1988), Turkish footballer
 Sündüz Keleş, Turkish statistician

Turkish-language surnames